The Argentine Association for the Study of Pain (AAED) is the Argentine chapter of the International Association for the Study of Pain (IASP), a medical professional organization promoting research, education and policies for the knowledge and management of pain. Founded in 1974, the Argentine chapter was the first national chapter of the IASP to be created in Latin America.

Among the association's political aims has been the promotion of a "right to treatment of pain" as a human right to be recognised by the United Nations.

See also
 International Association for the Study of Pain

References
 

Medical associations based in Argentina
Pain management